Zigmas Gudauskas (born 25 February 1958) is a Lithuanian rower. He competed in the men's coxless pair event at the 1992 Summer Olympics.

References

1958 births
Living people
Lithuanian male rowers
Olympic rowers of Lithuania
Rowers at the 1992 Summer Olympics
Place of birth missing (living people)